A single-ship action is a naval engagement fought between two warships of opposing sides, excluding submarine engagements; called so because there is a single ship on each side. The following is a list of notable single-ship actions.

Single-ship actions

Anglo-Spanish War
 1579, March 1 – Golden Hind captures the Spanish galleon Nuestra Señora de la Concepción.

Golden Age of Piracy
 1720, October 20 – British sloop Snow-Tyger under Jonathan Barnet captures the pirate sloop William and its owner Calico Jack.

War of the Austrian Succession
 1743, June 20 –  captures the Spanish treasure galleon Nuestra Señora de la Covadonga
 1746, 21 January –  captures the French privateer Marianne

Seven Years War
 1761, 1 January –  captures the French merchant frigate Bien Aimé.

American Revolutionary War
 1776, July 27 –  and  have an inconclusive engagement
 1777, 12 July – British merchantman Pole repulses the privateer American Tartar
 1778, April 24 –  captures  (details)
 1778, December – the Bristol privateer  has an inconclusive engagement with a French frigate
 1779, March  – the Bristol privateer  has an inconclusive engagement with an American privateer
 1779, May 7 –  captures 
 1779, September 7 – Molly repels an American privateer
 1779, September 10 –  defeats HMS West Florida in the Battle of Lake Pontchartrain.
 1779, September 14 –  defeats the Spanish frigate Santa Mónica. (details)
 1779, October 29 – the West Indiaman  exchanges fire with a French frigate; the frigate withdraws
 1779, November 11 – HMS Tartar captures the Spanish frigate Santa Margarita. (details)
 1780, June 1 – USS Trumbull engages the British privateer Watt; both ships withdraw
 1780, August 10 – HMS Flora defeats the French ship Nymphe in the first engagement thought to involve the carronade.(details)
 1780, September 9 –  has an inconclusive, three-hour engagement with 
 1781, January 9 – The sloop  captures the letter-of-marque 
 1781, March 7 – Liverpool privateer  captures French merchantman Sartine
 1781, March 23 – British privateer , of 14 guns, captures American letter of marque Tom Lee, of 12 guns.
 1781, May 1 –  captures the Spanish frigate Santa Leocadia. (details)
 1781, September 6 – American privateer Congress captures the British sloop . (details)
 1781, October 10 – the British privateer Goodrich has an inconclusive engagement with the American letter of marque St James
 1781, late December – French privateer Terror of England captures and releases the letter of marque 
 1782, February 28 –  captures 
 1782, April 6 – American privateer Tartar captures 
 1782, April 8 – Pennsylvania privateer Hyder Ally captures HMS General Monk. (details)
 1782, 9 August – HMS Duc de Chartres captures the French brig Aigle
 1782, August 12 – Frigate  inconclusively engages the French frigate Bellone
 1782, October 7 – The American privateer Buccaneer captures the British merchant ship 
(details)
 1783, January 20 –  captures the Dutch privateer Flushinger
 1783, January 22 – HMS Hussar captures the French frigate Sybille. (details)

French Revolutionary Wars
 1793, May 13 –  and Citoyenne Française conduct an inconclusive but sanguinary engagement
 1793, December 1 – The British packet ship Antelope captures the French privateer Atlante.
 1794, May 29 –  recaptures  (details)
 1794, July 28 – French privateer Guillotine captures merchant vessel 
 1794, September 5 – Merchantmen  repulses Républicaine
 1794, September 25 – Merchantman  repulses a French privateer
 1794, September – Enslaving ship  repels attack by French privateer Pervie
 1795 – The enslaving ship  repels an attack by a French privateer
 1795, January 4 –  captures Pique
 1795, March 13 –  captures the French frigate Tourterelle
 1795, October 30 – The enslaving ship Lord Stanley repels an attack by a French 12-gun schooner privateer
 1796, September – The enslaving ship  repels an attack by a French privateer
 1796, November 20 – Merchantman  engages a French privateer that blows up during the engagement
 1796, May 25 – HMS Suffisante captures the privateer Revanche
 1796, June 6 –  captures French frigate Tribune
 1796, October 8 & 9 – Merchant ship  repels attack by French privateer
 1796, November 28 – The enslaving ship  repels two different French privateers on the same day, each engagement representing a single-ship action
 1797, 29 January – French privateer Jeune Emilie captures the British merchant vessel 
 1797, March 13 – HMS Viper captures Nuestra Señora de la Piedad.
 1797, June 1 – The French privateer  captures the British slave ship 
 1797, August 15 –  captures French privateer Coq
 1797, August 29 – A French privateer captures the merchantman 
 1797, October –  captures French privateer Epicharis
 1797, October – Merchant ship  repels attack by French privateer
 1797, December 19 – Slave ship  blows up while engaging a French privateer
 1797, December 22 –  captures the French frigate Néréide
 1797, December 27 –  captures the Spanish ship St Raphael
 1798, January – 11  captures the French privateer Policrate
 1798, April 2 – HMS Mars captures the French ship Hercule
 1798, April 17 – HMS Recovery captures the French privateer Revanche
 1798, July 4 – French brig Lodi in an inconclusive engagement with the English privateer brig Acquila (probably Eagle)
 1798, June 21 – His Majesty's packet ship Princess Royal repels the French privateer Avanture.(details)
 1798, August 7 –  captures the Genoese pirate Liguria
 1798, September 18 – A French privateer captures the West Indiaman 
 1798, September 27 – The French privateer President Parker captures the Guineaman 
 1798, October 20 – HMS Racoon captures the French privateer Vigilante
 1798, December 12 – HMS Perdrix captures the French privateer L'Armée d' Italie
 1798, February 24 – French frigate Forte captures the East Indiaman Osterley, but then allows her to proceed.
 1798, March 1 – HMS Sybille captures French frigate Forte.
 1799, February 25 – French privateer Democrat captures merchantman 
 1799, March 18 – HM hired brig Telegraph captures French privateer Hirondelle
 1799, April 13 – HMS Amaranthe captures the French letter of marque Vengeur.
 1799, November 23 – Hired cutter Courier captures French privateer Guerrier
 1799, November 26 – Merchant ship  repels attack by a French privateer
 1799, December 2 – HMS Racoon captures French privateer Intrepide
 1799, December 2 – the British merchantman  captures the French privateer corvette Entreprenante
 1799, December 26 – HMS Viper captures the French privateer Furet
 1800, March 5 –  captures the privateer Heureux
 1800, March 31 – French privateer Minerve captures the United States letter of marque Minerva
 1800, August 20 –  captures the French ship Vengeance
 1800, October 7 – French privateer Confiance captures British East Indiaman Kent
 1800, October 8 –  captures the French privateer Quidproquo
 1800, October – American merchant ship Rebecca repels French privateer Malartic
 1800, November 11 – East Indiaman Phoenix captures French privateer Malartic.
 1800, November 13 –  defeats and drives off the French privateer Bellone
 1800, November 22 -  repels a French privateer off Muscat
 1801, January 17 – The French privateer  captures the Guineaman 
 1801, March 5 – French privateer Gironde captures merchantman 
 1801, March 23 –  captures the French privateer 
 1801, April – British merchantman Union Island repels a Spanish privateer
 1801, May – French privateer captures the British merchantman Union Island
 1801, May 6 –  captures Spanish xebec frigate El Gamo (Details)*
 1801, June 14 – Liverpool privateer  repels French privateer Mouche
 1801, August 18 –  captures Spanish letter of marque Theresa
 1801, September 25 –  has an inconclusive engagement with a privateer flying the Spanish colors off Hispaniola.
 1801, November 20 – A Spanish frigate of 44 guns captures the Liverpool privateer Gneral Keppel

Quasi-War
 1799, February 9 – USS Constellation captures the French frigate L'Insurgente (details)
 1799, October 24 – Merchantman Washington drives off the French privateer frigate Bellone
 1800, February 1 – USS Constellation defeats the French frigate La Vengeance (details)
 1800, July 4 - USS Enterprise captures French privateer L'Aigle
 1800, October 12 – USS Boston captures the French corvette Berceau (details)
 1800, October 25 – USS Enterprise captures French privateer Flambeau (details)

First Barbary War
 1801, August 1 – United States Navy warship USS Enterprise captures  Tripolitanian corsair Tripoli near Malta. (details)

Napoleonic Wars
 1803, July 7 – French privateer  captures the British privateer 
 1803, July 16 –  captures French brig-corvette Lodi.
 1803, August 13 – French privateer Bellone captures the East Indiaman Lord Nelson
 1803, August 17 – HMS Racoon destroys French naval brig Mutine.
 1803, August 27 –  recaptures the East Indiaman Lord Nelson
 1803, October 15 – The British slave ship  captures the French slave ship Braave
 1803 – Guineaman  repels an attack by a French privateer
 1804, January 24 –  repels an attack by a French privateer
 1804, February 5 –  engages the 22-gun French privateer Grande Decide.
 1804, March 21 – French privateer Blonde captures and sinks HMS Wolverine.
 1804, March 9 – French privateer Grande Decide captures British merchantman 
 1804, March 25 or 28 –  captures French privateer Egyptienne
 1804, April – A French privateer captures the slave ship  and takes her and her cargo of slaves into Guadeloupe
 1804, May 12 – A French privateer captures the slave ship 
 1804, June 21 –  unsuccessfully engages the Guadeloupe privateer Buonaparte.
 1804, July 15 – French privateer Dame Ambert captures HMS Lilly
 1804, July 31 –  captures French privateer Hirondelle
 1804, August 4 – French privateer  captures the West Indiaman  
 1804, August 14 –  captures English merchantman 
 1804, August 5 – Merchantman  repels attack by French privateer General Ernouf
 1804, January 26 – Merchantman Scarborough repels attack by a French privateer
 1804, September 12 –  captures Dutch merchantman Swift
 1804, December 27 – Slave ship  repels an attack by a French privateer
 1804, late – Slave ship  repels an attack by a French privateer
 1805, February – the whaler  unsuccessfully attacks a Batavian vessel
 1805, February 2 – Slave ship  repels an attack by a French privateer
 1805, February 8 –  captures French privateer Dame Ernouf
 1805, February 13 –  captures French frigate Psyche
 1805, March 10 – Private ship of war  captures the Spanish private ship of war Felicity/Felicidad
 1805, March 20 – French privateer Général Ernouf explodes during an engagement with 
 1805, May 16 – The French privateer Hirondelle captures 
 1805, July 19 –  captures 
 1805, August 10 –  captures 
 1805, August 16 –  vs the 
 1805, October 13 – Spanish merchantman Nuestra Senora de Isiar (alias Joaquina), captures British privateer  
 1805, October 20 – British privateer  fails to capture a Spanish privateer brig
 1805, November –  vs 
 1805, November 4 – French privateer Creole captures slaver and merchantman 
 1805, November 28 – Inconclusive engagement between the French privateer Bellone and the East Indiaman 
 1805, November 30 – a French privateer captures the slave ship 
 1806, January 23 – French privateer captures and sinks 
 1806, February 15 –  captures the French letter of marque Princess Murat
 1806, February – French privateer Hebe captures British merchantman 
 1806, March 3–4 –  vs. an unknown British post ship
 1806, May 11 – French ship Abeille captures 
 1806, May 14 –  vs French Minerve
 1806, May 25 – Merchant ship  repels attack by French privateer Fairey
 1806, June 21 –  captures the East Indiaman  at 
 1806, July 19 – HMS Blanche captures French Guerrière
 1806, August 2 – The fireship  repels an attack by the French privateer lugger Elize
 1806, October 25 – Spanish privateer mistico Generalísimo captures HM gunboat Hannah
 1806, October 26 –  captures the French privateer Superbe
 1806, December 29 –  captures French privateer Deux Frères
 1807, January 3 –  captures the French privateer Favorite
 1807, March 14 – French privateer Alerte captures merchantman 
 1807, April 25 – French privateer Dame Villaret captures 
 1807, August 19 –  captures the Danish frigate Fredericksvaern.
 1807, September 9 – A French privateer captures the British slave ship 
 1807, October 1 – British packet ship  captures the French privateer Jeune Richard. (details)
 1807, October 17 –  captures the French privateer schooner Tape a L’Oeil.
 1807, December 3 –  has an inconclusive engagement with French privateer Revanche.
 1808, March 2 – HMS Sappho captures Danish privateer Admiral Yawl
 1808, March 6–8 – HMS San Fiorenzo captures French frigate Piémontaise
 1808, March 7 – A French privateer captures the slave ship 
 1808, March 14 – HDMS Lougen engages in an inconclusive action with 
 1808, May 11 and 12 –  vs French 16-gun brig of war Requin, later captured by 
 1808, June 24 –  captures the Russian cutter Opyt
 1808, July 5 and 6 –  captures Turkish frigate Badere Zaffer
 1808, July 16&17 –  repelled a Spanish and a French privateer in two separate single-ship actions.
 1808, August 11 – HMS Comet captures French corvette Sylphe
 1808, September 6 – HMS Recruit vs French corvette Diligente
 1808, September 29 – French navy corvette Départment-des-Landes captures 
 1808, October 3 – French brig Palinure captures HMS Carnation
 1809, August 7 – The Liverpool merchantman  repels an attack by a French privateer
 1809, late – The Liverpool merchantman  repels an attack by a French privateer
 1810, January 11 –  captures French brig Oreste
 1810, 10 February –  captures the Dutch naval vessel 
 1810, August 10 – His Majesty's Hired armed cutter Queen Charlotte drives off a substantially larger and more heavily armed French vessel.
 1810, August 22 – the British letter of marque merchantman  repels an attack by a French privateer
 1810, October 14 –  captures the French privateer schooner Sans Souci
 1810, November 1 – The French privateer  captures the merchant ship Leander
 1811, early –  captures an Ottoman polacca off Samos
 1811, September 11 –  captures the Dutch brig Zephyr off Manado
 1812, February 22 –  captures  in Battle of Pirano
 1812, July 21 –  captures the French privateer Ville de Caen
 1812, December 1 – French privateer Sans Souci captures the South Seas whaler Frederick
 1812, December 18 –  repels an attack by a French privateer
 1812, December 29 –  captures the French privateer lugger Rusé
 1813, February 7 –  and the French frigate Aréthuse engage in an inconclusive but sanguinary four-hour night battle
 1813, September 10 – French privateer cutter Renard destroys the schooner 
 1813, October 9 –  captures the French privateer Neptune
 1814, January 6 – the West Indiaman  repels an attack by a Carthaginian privateer just outside Havana
 1814, March 27 –  captures French frigate Étoile

War of 1812

 1807, June 22 Chesapeake–Leopard affair –  boards USS Chesapeake
 1811, May 16 Little Belt affair – USS President fires on HMS Little Belt
 1812, June 18 – USS Essex captures 
 1812, July – the American privateer Matilda captures the British merchantman Ranger
 1812, August 1 – the American privateer Yankee captures and burns the British merchantman 
 1812, August 19 – USS Constitution defeats HMS Guerriere
 1812, August 22 – HMS Barbados defeats US Revenue Cutter James Madison
 1812, September 8 – French privateer brig Diligent (or Diligente or Diligence) captures the schooner 
 1812, September 16 – American privateer  captures the packet 
 1812, October 18 – USS Wasp defeats 
 1812, October 18 –  defeats USS Wasp
 1812, October 25 –  captures 
 1812, November 2 – British letter-of-marque  repels US privateer Retaliation
 1812, November 21 – Merchantman  repels attack by American privateer brig Alfred
 1812, November 22 –  captures USS Vixen
 1812, December 11 – American privateer Saratoga captures the British letter of marque  in the Battle of La Guaira
 1812, December 29 – USS Constitution destroys 
 1812, December – British merchantman  repels attack by privateer Alexander, of Salem 
 1813, January 17 –  captures 
 1813, January 1 – The Falmouth packet  repels an attack by an American privateer
 1813, January 25 – The American privateer  captures the merchantman 
 1813, February 24 – USS Hornet defeats 
 1813, March 11 –  and the American privateer  have an inconclusive engagement
 1813, March 22 – The British letter of marque  captures the American privateer Matilda
 1813, April – The American letter of marque  captures the British armed merchantman Malvina
 1813, April 14 – The American privateer  captures, plunders, and releases the Falmouth Post Office Packet Service's 
 1813, April 13 – The American privateer Yorktown captures the Falmouth packet 
 1813, May 23 –  vs. Virginia privateer schooner Roger
 1813, May 23 – The American privateer Young Teazer captures the Falmouth packet  
 1813, May 28 –  captures the whaler 
 1813, May 30 – The United States privateer Yankee captures the British merchant vessel 
 1813, June 1 –  captures USS Chesapeake in the Battle of Boston Harbor
 1813, June 9 – The Falmouth Post Office Packet Service's  repels an attack by an American privateer
 1813, June 24 – American privateer Yorktown captures 
 1813, August 5 – Privateer Decatur captures 
 1813, August 14 –  captures USS Argus
 1813, September 5 – USS Enterprise captures 
 1813, September 23 – USS President captures 
 1813, October 22 – US Revenue Cutter Vigilant defeats Canadian privateer Dart
 1813, December 14 –  repels an attack by a 20-gun American privateer schooner
 1813, December 25 –  captures USS Vixen II
 1814, January 11 – British merchantman  drives off the American privateer Comet
 1814, February –  captures American privateer-brig  Alfred
 1814, February 14 – USS Constitution destroys 
 1814, March 14 –  repels an attack by the American privateer Jacob Johns
 1814, March 28 –  captures USS Essex in the Battle of Valparaiso
 1814, April 19 – The American privateer General Armstrong captures the British letter-of-marque 
 1814, April 20 – , with  approaching, captures USS Frolic
 1814, April 29 – USS Peacock captures 
 1814, May 1 – Falmouth packet  repels attack by American privateer 
 1814, June 22 –  captures USS Rattlesnake
 1814, June 28 – USS Wasp captures HMS Reindeer
 1814, July 12 – American privateer Syren captures 
 1814, July 12 –  captures USS Syren
 1814, August 17 – The transport  repels an attack by the U.S. privateer York
 1814, September 1 – USS Wasp sinks 
 1814, October – The packet ship  repelled an attach by a U.S. privateer
 1814, October 11 –  defeats the US Revenue Cutter Eagle
 1814, October 11 – American privateer Prince de Neufchatel resists 
 1814, December 20 –  captures the American letter of marque Java
 1815, January 15 –  defeats USS President
 1815, January 28 – American privateer Surprise captures the British merchantman Star
 1815, February 9 – American privateer Kemp captures the Post Office Packet Service's packet 
 1815, February 11 – Post-office packet ship  repels an American privateer
 1815, March 8 –  captures the American privateer Avon
 1815, March 15 – American privateer Roger captures the British packet ship 
 1815, March 23 – USS Hornet captures 
 1815, June 15 – USS Peacock captures Nautilus, a brig of the Bombay Marine of the East India Company

Argentine War of Independence
 1825, January 25 – Buenos Aires privateer Tupac Amaru (ex-US Regent) captures the Spanish merchantman

Suppression of the slave trade
 1828, April 2 –  captures Providentia
 1828, May 1 – HMS Black Joke captures Presidenté
 1829, February 1  – HMS Black Joke captures Almirante
 1829, June 5 –  captures Voladora
 1829, June 26 –  captures Midas
 1830, September 7 –  captures Veloz Passagera (details)
 1832, June 3 –  captures the slaver Aquila off Cuba

Texas Revolution
 1835, June 15 – USRC Ingham engages the Mexican schooner Montezuma.
 1836, March 6 – Texas schooner Liberty captures the Mexican schooner Pelicano
 1836, April 3 – Texas schooner Invincible sinks the Mexican schooner Montezuma.

War of the Confederation
 1837, February 5 – Chilean brig Aquiles, which kept the port of Callao blocked, attacked the Confederate schooner Yanacocha and forced her to return to her anchorage.
 1838, January 18 – Chilean corvette Libertad captured the Confederate corvette Confederación on the coast of Callao.

First Schleswig War

Crimean War
 1853, November 17 – Russian steam frigate Vladimir captures Turkish/Egyptian steam frigate Pervaz Bahri in the Black Sea

American Civil War
 1861, July 18 – USS St. Lawrence sinks privateer Petrel off Charleston, South Carolina
 1863, January 11 – CSS Alabama sinks USS Hatteras off Galveston Island, Texas
 1864, June 19 – USS Kearsarge sinks CSS Alabama off Cherbourg, France
 1864, October 7 – USS Wachusett captures CSS Florida in Bahia Harbour, Brazil

Chincha Islands War
 1865, November 26 – Chilean corvette Esmeralda captured the Spanish schooner Virgen de Covadonga. (details)

Franco-Prussian War

(details)

Russo-Turkish War of 1877–1878
 1877, July 23 – Ottoman central battery ironclad Feth-i Bülend duels inconclusively with Russian auxiliary cruiser Vesta in the Black Sea.

War of the Pacific
 1879, May 21 – Peruvian ironclad Huáscar sinks Chilean corvette . (details)
(details)
 1880, April 4 – Inconclusive engagement in Tocopilla between the small Chilean steamer Taltal and the armed Peruvian transport Oroya.

Spanish–American War
 1898, April 25 – Spanish gunboat Ligera repulses an attack by American torpedo boat USS Foote (details)

Venezuelan Civil War
 1902, February 7 – Rebel auxiliary cruiser Libertador sinks Venezuelan gunboat General Crespo.

Mexican Revolution

 1914, March 31 – Huertistas gunboat Guerrero sinks Constitutionalist gunboat Tampico at the Third Battle of Topolobampo
 1914, June 16 – Huertistas gunboat Guerrero sinks Constitutionalist gunboat Tampico at the Fourth Battle of Topolobampo

World War I
 1914, August 4 - British light cruiser HMS Bristol indecisively engages German light cruiser SMS Karlsruhe
 1914, August 26 – British cruiser  defeats German auxiliary cruiser  in the Battle of Río de Oro
 1914, September 9 – British gunboat HMS Dwarf engages German armed yacht Herzogin Elisabeth in an action in the Wouri River
 1914, September 14 – British armed merchantman HMS Carmania sinks German auxiliary cruiser  in an engagement off Trindade Island in the South Atlantic
 1914, September 16 – British gunboat HMS Dwarf sinks German customs cutter Nachtigal in an action in the Wouri River
 1914, September 20 – In the Battle of Zanzibar, the German cruiser  attacks and sinks the British cruiser  while it is in harbour for repairs.
 1914, November 9 – Australian light cruiser  defeats German light cruiser  in the Battle of Cocos.
 1915, June 2 – British gunboat HMS Odin damages Ottoman gunboat Marmaris which beaches itself off Amarah in the Tigris River.
 1915, August 8 – German auxiliary cruiser SMS Meteor sinks British Armed Boarding Steamer Ramsey off Fair Isle
 1917, February 26 – British gunboat HMS Mantis damages Ottoman gunboat Doğan which runs aground near Al Aziziyah.
 1917, March 10 – German auxiliary cruiser  sinks New Zealand freighter Otaki but is seriously damaged

Russian Civil War
 1920, May 3 –  Soviet floating battery Krasnaya Zarya engages French sloop Le Scarpe off Ochakov, damaging her and forcing her surrender.

World War II
 1940, July 13 – German auxiliary cruiser Atlantis sinks British liner  after a short action in the Indian Ocean.
 1940, July 28 – German auxiliary cruiser Thor indecisively engages British armed merchant cruiser HMS Alcantara.
 1940, November 5 – German heavy cruiser  sinks convoy escort armed merchant cruiser  in the North Atlantic.
 1940, November 9 – The Free French aviso Savorgnan de Brazza sinks her sister ship, Vichy French aviso Bougainville, off Libreville.
 1940, December 5 – German auxiliary cruiser Thor drives off and mauls British auxiliary cruiser .
 1941, February 27 –  sinks Italian auxiliary cruiser Ramb I in a brief engagement off the Maldives.
 1941, May 8 – The British heavy cruiser  sinks German auxiliary cruiser  in an engagement off the Seychelles.
 1941, November 19 – The German auxiliary cruiser Kormoran and Australian light cruiser  sink each other near Western Australia.
 1942, April 1 – German auxiliary cruiser Thor sinks British freighter Willesden after a brief action.
 1942, June 6 – German auxiliary cruiser  sinks the tanker SS Stanvac Calcutta in the South Atlantic.
 1942, July 20 – German auxiliary cruiser Thor sinks British reefer Indus in a brief action.
 1942, September 27 – German auxiliary cruiser  and American Liberty ship  sink each other in the South Atlantic.
 1943, October 31 – November 1 –  and  engage in a pitched battle ending with Borie ramming the submarine. Both ships are lost.

Ecuadorian–Peruvian War
 1941, July 25 – Ecuadorian gunboat Abdón Calderón duels inconclusively with Peruvian destroyer Almirante Villar off Jambeli

Korean War
 1950, June 25 – ROKS Baekdusan sinks a North Korean troop transport in Battle of Korea Strait
 1950, September 10 – ROKS PC-703 sinks North Korean minelayer

Vietnam War
 1968, March 1 – USCGC Winona sinks North Vietnamese naval trawler T-A

Sri Lankan Civil War
 2003, March 10 –  sinks LTTE logistic vessel MV Koimer off Mullaitivu

Anti-piracy off Somalia
 18 November 2008 – INS Taber sinks the trawler Ekawat Nava 5, which Somali pirates had captured.
 29 March 2009 – German naval tanker Spessart engages and repulses a Somali pirate skiff.
 10 April 2010 –  sinks a Somali pirate skiff in a brief action.
 28 January 2011 – INS Cankarso sinks Somali pirate trawler Prantalay 14 off Minicoy Island. (details)
 22 March 2011 – HMAS Stuart destroys a Somali pirate skiff being towed by the pirated .
 26 March 2011 – Indian off-shore patrol vessel INS Suvarna captures pirated trawler MV Mortaza
 12 May 2011 – USS Stephen W. Groves sinks Somali pirate longliner Jih Chun Tsai 68 in the Indian Ocean off Somalia.
 12 May 2011 – HDMS Esbern Snare sinks Somali pirate dhow FV NN Iran
 22 November 2011 – Italian destroyer Andrea Doria duels inconclusively with a Somali pirate skiff.
 12 January 2012 –  captures a Somali pirate skiff

Anti-piracy in the Gulf of Guinea
 28 August 2012 – Pirated tanker Energy Centurian fights off a Togolese navy patrol vessel and escapes.
 19 February 2016 – Nigerian frigate NNS Okpabana captures the pirated tanker Elvis-3 in the Gulf of Guinea in a contested boarding action.

Second Libyan Civil War
 6 April 2017 – A Libyan Coast Guard vessel captures a migrant smuggling vessel after an action off Zawiya.

Anti-piracy off Venezuela 

 30 March 2020 – Cruise-liner RCGS Resolute inadvertently sinks Venezuelan Patrol Boat Naiguatá after being attacked by Naiguatá in international waters.

See also

 List of naval battles
 List of submarine actions
 Bibliography of early U.S. naval history

References

Naval warfare
Naval lists
Lists of naval battles